Four ships named Vansittart, the first probably for Peter van Sittart (father of Henry Vansittart), served the British East India Company (EIC) as East Indiamen:

 , of 480 tons (bm), was launched in 1718 and was lost in 1719 on the outward leg of her maiden voyage.
 , of 676 tons (bm), was launched in 1763, made four voyages for the EIC, and was sold for breaking up in 1775.
 , of 829 tons (bm), was launched in 1780 and made three full voyages for the EIC before she was lost in 1789 on her way to China on her fourth voyage.  helped rescue her crew and much of her treasure.

 , of 1312 tons (bm), was launched in 1813 at Calcutta and made 11 voyages for the EIC. Afterwards, between 1834 and 1842, she traded with China from India until she was lost in 1842 in a fire at Bombay.

Ships of the British East India Company
Merchant ships of the United Kingdom
Age of Sail merchant ships